The People's Liberal Democratic Party (abbreviation: PLDP) is a dormant political party in Singapore. It was formed by Ooi Boon Ewe, an independent candidate in the 2001 general election in Singapore. The party was approved in the midst of the 2006 general election hustling, but was days late for nomination. The party's current status is unknown.

2006 and 2011 elections
As PLDP was registered after nomination day for the 2006 general election, Ooi was not able to contest the election under the PLDP banner.

PLDP attempted to contest in the 2011 general election, with Ooi running for the Sengkang West Single Member Constituency. However, on Nomination Day, Ooi's assentor did not turn up, leading to Ooi publicly appealing to the opposition's supporters to be his assentor but to be rejected by the crowd. He  subsequently shed tears over again the inability to participate in elections, being in his 70s and having desired to become a Member of Parliament.

Later in 2011, Ooi resigned as PLDP's chairman to contest in the 2011 presidential election as the presidential candidate must be a non-partisan member.

References

External links
Background of PLDP
Ooi's shed into tears after being unable to contest in 2011 GE
Sengkang West SMC's result in 2011 GE after the absence of PLDP

2006 establishments in Singapore
Political parties established in 2006
Political parties in Singapore
Social democratic parties in Asia
Socialist parties in Singapore